Myrtis may refer to:

Myrtis, an ancient Greek girl, whose remains were unearthed in 1994–1995
Myrtis of Anthedon
Myrtis (genus), a monotypic genus ofhummingbird, the Purple-collared Woodstar